Macrosiagon is a genus of wedge-shaped beetles in the family Ripiphoridae. There are more than 20 described species in Macrosiagon. Under the rules of the ICZN, the nomenclatural gender of the genus name is feminine, as it is based on the Greek word "siagon" (σῐᾱγών), for "jaw", which is feminine in gender, despite recent publications erroneously treating the gender as neuter (e.g. )

Selected species

 Macrosiagon acutipennis Pierce, 1904
 Macrosiagon bifasciata (Marseul, 1877)
 Macrosiagon bifoveata Horn, 1875
 Macrosiagon bimaculata (Fabricius, 1787)
 Macrosiagon bipunctata (Fabricius, 1801)
 Macrosiagon capito (Blackburn, 1899)
 Macrosiagon championi (Blackburn, 1899)
 Macrosiagon crassipes (Lea, 1917)
 Macrosiagon cruenta (Germar, 1824)
 Macrosiagon cucullata (W.J. Macleay, 1887)
 Macrosiagon cyanivestis Marseul, 1876
 †Macrosiagon deuvei Batelka, Collomb & Nel, 2006
 Macrosiagon difficilis (Blackburn, 1899)
 Macrosiagon dimidiata (Fabricius, 1781)
 Macrosiagon diversiceps (Blackburn, 1899)
 Macrosiagon elegans Marseul, 1876
 Macrosiagon ebboi Perrichot, Nel & Néraudeau, 2004
 Macrosiagon fernalda Rivnay, 1929
 Macrosiagon ferruginea (Fabricius, 1775)
 Macrosiagon flavipennis (LeConte, 1866)
 Macrosiagon fortieri (Chobaut, 1893)
 Macrosiagon grombczewskii (Semenov, 1891)
 Macrosiagon interioris (Blackburn, 1899)
 Macrosiagon laeviceps (Lea, 1917)
 Macrosiagon limbata (Fabricius, 1792)
 Macrosiagon macleayi Csiki, 1913
 Macrosiagon maculicollis (Boheman, 1858)
 Macrosiagon medvedevi Iablokoff-Khnzorian, 1973
 Macrosiagon meridionalis (Costa, 1859)
 Macrosiagon nasuta (Thunberg, 1784)
 Macrosiagon nigroapicalis (Lea, 1917)
 Macrosiagon novaehollandiae (Gerstaecker, 1855)
 Macrosiagon oberthurii (Fairmaire, 1879)
 Macrosiagon octomaculata (Gerstaecker, 1855)
 Macrosiagon pallidipennis (Reitter, 1898)
 Macrosiagon pectinata (Fabricius, 1775)
 Macrosiagon pictipennis (Lea, 1904)
 Macrosiagon praeusta (Gebler, 1830)
 Macrosiagon punctata (Fabricius, 1787)
 Macrosiagon punctulaticeps (Blackburn, 1899)
 Macrosiagon pusilla (Gerstaecker, 1855)
 Macrosiagon rufofasciata (Lea, 1917)
 Macrosiagon sayi (LeConte, 1858)
 Macrosiagon semipunctata (Lea, 1904)
 Macrosiagon setipennis (Lea, 1917)
 Macrosiagon sobrina (Waterhouse, 1883)
 Macrosiagon spinicollis (Fairmaire, 1893)
 Macrosiagon terminata (Laporte, 1840)
 Macrosiagon tricolor (Gerstaecker, 1855)
 Macrosiagon tricuspidata (Lepechin, 1774)
 Macrosiagon vittata (Erichson, 1847)

References

Further reading

External links

 

Ripiphoridae
Articles created by Qbugbot